“The Return” is a work of short fiction by Joseph Conrad, first published in the collection Tales of Unrest published  in 1898 by T. Fisher Unwin.

Plot
Alvan Hervey is a well-to-do Englishman living in the West End of London with his wife of five years. Tall, good-looking and accomplished in business, Hervey is representative of his social class: conventional, self-complacent, and “eminently proper.” He and his wife limit their social life primarily to a small circle of acquaintances. A well-connected literary gentleman in this circle convinces Hervey to provide funds to publish a society paper. Though skeptical about the paper, and considering the literary figure an “ass”, he warms to the project when it proves profitable.

Alvan arrives home early one evening and finds that his wife is not in. To his dismay, he discovers a note from her in the dressing room. Instantly alarmed and deeply offended by this odd breach of decorum, he reads that letter to find that she has left the literary associate: “She’s gone…And—with that . . . ass,” Rather than heart-broken, Hervey's humiliation sickens him physically. He contemplates a divorce with horror. His greatest outrage is that she has disturbed the propriety of his life. In his rage he utters: “I wish him joy...Damn the woman.”

To his astonishment and horror, his wife suddenly returns home that evening. The husband takes her crestfallen appearance as evidence that she feels remorse and  wishes to be redeemed for her transgression As such, he is blind to the unbearable relationship that has compelled his wife to flee. The initial shock to his self-esteem is replaced with a powerful sense of propriety: he quickly reasserts his authority. Her effort to break down her husband's superficiality has failed. Recognizing that a rapprochement with his wife is impossible, Hervey flees from the house: “He never returned.”

Background
“The Return” proved to be an immensely frustrating project for Conrad during the summer of 1897. He described his struggle to confident Edward Sanderson:

Even as “The Return” was collected in Tales of Unrest (1898), Conrad remarked: “My innermost feeling, now, is that it is a left-handed work.”

Literary critic Laurence Graver reports that Conrad's opinion of the story improved when publisher Edward Garnett decided to collect the work in its entirety rather than serializing it. In a measure of Conrad's ambivalence towards the work, he later wrote  that “The Return” was “not a tale for puppy dogs nor for maids of thirteen. I am not in the least ashamed of it. Quite the reverse.”

Critical Assessment
Conrad's doubt as to the worthiness of “The Return” was seconded by critics who, according to Jocelyn Baines “virtually ignored” the work.

Baines reports that “the story tends in places to ponderousness and prolixity, but it is packed with remarkably sharp insight and ironical wit.”

Critic Alfred J. Guerard declares that “The Return” exposes Conrad's difficulty in handling marital strife, describing it as “the most troubled expression of Conrad’s confused misogyny and the extreme example of his creative bewilderment in the presence of a sexual situation.” Guerard judges the work to be “Conrad’s worst story of any length, and one of the worst written by a great novelist.”

Literary critic Edward W. Said considers “The Return” to be “in some ways the most interesting” of Conrad's early fiction.

Theme
Literary critic Jocelyn Baines calls the story “a tragedy of misunderstanding” Baines writes:

The thematic center, according to Said, resides in the chronicling of a man's failure to grasp the significance of his wife's confused attempt to confront her husband with the emptiness and absurdity of their lives. Hervey's rage at his wife's perfidy is centered in his shame: “The powerful influence of shame is what, I think, makes this story an epitome of Conrad’s earliest group of short works.”  The threat of public shame thrust Hervey into a crisis of self. Said comments on the Sartreian crisis facing the protagonist:

Footnotes

Sources
Baines, Jocelyn. 1960. Joseph Conrad: A Critical Biography, McGraw-Hill Book Company, New York. 
Graver, Laurence. 1969. Conrad’s Short Fiction. University of California Press, Berkeley, California. 
Guerard, Albert J.. 1965. Conrad: The Novelist. Harvard University Press, Cambridge, Massachusetts. LOC Catalog Card Number 58-8995. 
Said, Edward W.. 1966. The Past and Present: Conrad’s Shorter Fiction, from Said's Joseph Conrad and the Fiction of Autobiography.Harvard University Press, in Joseph Conrad: Modern Critical Reviews,  Harold Bloom editor. Chelsea House Publishers. 1987 pp. 29–51 

1898 short stories
Short stories by Joseph Conrad